Ústí nad Orlicí is a town in the Pardubice Region of the Czech Republic. It has about 14,000 inhabitants. The historic town centre is well preserved and is protected by law as an urban monument zone.

Administrative parts

Town parts of Hylváty, Kerhartice and Knapovec and villages of Černovír, Dolní Houžovec, Horní Houžovec and Oldřichovice are administrative parts of Ústí nad Orlicí.

Geography
It is situated at the confluence of the river Tichá Orlice and Třebovka. It lies in the Svitavy Uplands.

Etymology
The name Ústí means literally "mouth (of the river)". It refers to its location at the confluence of rivers. The German name Wildenschwert was created by a distortion of the original German name Wilhelmswerd, which referred to one of colonizers on the area, Wilhelm von Dürnholz, and meant "Wilhelm's promontory".

History
Ústí nad Orlicí was founded in the second half of the 13th century, during the reign of Ottokar II of Bohemia. Its predecessor was a Slavic settlement called Oustí. The first written mention of the town was in 1285, when the King Wenceslaus II gifted the town to Zavis of Falkenstein.

In 1292, after Zavis' death, Wenceslaus II gifted the settlement to the Cistercian monks at Königsaal. They passed the town to the Leitomischl bishopric in 1358. During the 15th and 16th centuries, it was owned by various noble families, including was the Kostka of Postupice or the Pernštejn family.

The town was damaged by a large fire in 1495. After the Battle of White Mountain, Ústí was acquired by the Liechtenstein family. There were guilds of weavers established here in the 16th century. The town was slow to recover from the lootings of the Thirty Years' War, then was destroyed by fire in 1705.

It gained municipal status in 1795. When Wildenschwert was connected to the railway network by the Olomouc – Prague line in 1845, the textile business boomed. It gained the tagline of The Manchester of Eastern Bohemia, and became an important textile centre. It was an important railway junction and from 1850 became a regional centre.

It was a German-speaking town in Austria-Hungary until it was allocated to Czechoslovakia in 1918 at the conclusion of the World War I. Ústí nad Orlicí as it was now called remained an important textile town, and in the 1960s the Cotton Researching Institute developed the Open end spinning technique that provided a faster alternative to ring spinning.

Demographics

Sights

Mírové Square is a regular rectangular square with a floor plan preserved since the founding of the town. The square is surrounded by valuable arcaded houses. In the middle of the square is Marian column from 1737. The Baroque town hall was built in 1721–1723 and replaced the old town hall destroyed by fire. A school was built next to it in 1793. In 1850, the two buildings were structurally connected.

The Church of the Assumption of the Virgin Mary is a late Baroque building from 1770–1776. The adjoining deanery building is from 1742–1748.

Notable people

František Martin Pecháček (1763–1816), composer
Leopold Jansa (1795–1875), violinist and composer
Fritz Löhner-Beda (1883–1942), Jewish author
Jaroslav Kocian (1883–1950), violinist
Oldřich Marek (1911–1986), entomologist
Emila Medková (1928–1985), photographer
Martin Netolický (1956–1999), politician
Roman Dostál (born 1970), biathlete
Zdeňka Žádníková-Volencová (born 1974), actress
Martin Netolický (born 1982), politician
Michal Šlesingr (born 1983), biathlete
Ondřej Moravec (born 1984), biathlete
Jaroslav Kulhavý (born 1985), mountain biker, Olympic winner
Kamil Vacek (born 1987), footballer

Twin towns – sister cities

Ústí nad Orlicí is twinned with:
 Amberg, Germany
 Bystrzyca Kłodzka, Poland
 Massa Martana, Italy
 Neukölln (Berlin), Germany
 Poprad, Slovakia

Gallery

References

External links

Cities and towns in the Czech Republic
Populated places in Ústí nad Orlicí District
Shtetls
Jewish communities in the Czech Republic
House of Liechtenstein